is the debut single by Japanese band Globe. Written by Tetsuya Komuro, the single was released on August 9, 1995, by Avex Globe.

Background and release 
"Feel Like Dance" was used as the theme song of the Fuji TV drama series .

The single peaked at No. 3 on Oricon's weekly chart. It sold over 952,000 copies and was certified Double Platinum by the RIAJ.

Track listing

Charts
Weekly charts

Year-end charts

Certification

Cover versions 
 Tomomi Kahara covered the song on her 2015 cover album Memories 3: Kahara Back to 1995.
 Tetsuya Komuro self-covered the song as a piano solo on the 2015 Globe tribute album #globe20th: Special Cover Best.

References

External links
 Official website

1995 debut singles
1995 songs
Japanese-language songs
Japanese television drama theme songs
Songs written by Tetsuya Komuro
Avex Trax singles